Swish and Nadirah X wed in 2010. Shortly after their marriage, Nadirah began traveling around the world working with Tim Kring for the Conspiracy Of Good web series. The main part of the web series was filmed in London, where Swish and Nadirah performed at various venues. At the end event of Conspiracy For Good, Swish performed alongside Dave Stewart, Ann Marie-Calhoun, and Nadirah X. After London, Swish and Nadirah flew to Jamaica, and received an email from Dave Stewart asking them to start a duo. Swish and Nadirah agreed, and after Stewart named them "Mr & Mrs. Swish" they began working on production for the project, and the two wrote the songs together. After sending demo versions of songs back to Stewart, they decided to go ahead with the project. In 2011, the duo came back to Los Angeles and began working on music for the Mr & Mrs album.

2012: Mr and Mrs EP release 
In 2012, Swish released an EP with Nadirah X under the Mr & Mrs name, as a free download. The EP received positive reviews in The Huffington Post and LA Weekly, which praised his production style and their lyrical ability. In a YouTube interview by the blog "At Street Level", their music and production was described as 'unique.' Dave Stewart is quoted as saying, "It's refreshing seeing a married couple working intensely together rapping about stuff that directly relates to them and their situation: one so many other couples can relate to," Stewart said. "I liken their spirit to Ashford and Simpsons when they sang 'solid, solid as a rock.'" Because of the success of the EP, Swish and Nadirah X have met with various record labels.

In 2012, Swish was featured on Bishop Lamont's mixtape, The Layover, twice. Swish can be heard on one track called "Trail Mix" and a second track entitled, "I Swear", featuring Royce da 5'9". Swish previously worked with Bishop on a track entitled "It's Over" featuring Rapper Big Pooh.

References

Hip hop record producers
American rappers
People from Clinton, Mississippi
Living people
Year of birth missing (living people)
University of Southern Mississippi alumni
21st-century American rappers